This is a list of episodes from the Fox sitcom Ned and Stacey which aired for two seasons from 1995 to 1997. The New York City-set series focused on obsessive-compulsive advertising executive Ned Dorsey and neurotic journalist Stacey Colbert, who have nothing in common except their marriage of convenience. Also featured on the series are Stacey's sister and brother-in-law Amanda and Eric Moyer, the latter of whom is an accountant at Ned's advertising agency and his best friend.

35 of the 46 produced episodes were originally broadcast in the United States on Fox from September 11, 1995, to January 27, 1997. The additional 11 unaired episodes were not aired in the United States, and remained so until the complete series was released on DVD.

Series overview

Broadcast history

Episodes

Season 1 (1995–96)

Season 2 (1996–1997, 2017)

References

Notes

External links
 

Ned and Stacey episodes, List of